The  2004 AFF Women's Championship was hosted by Vietnam. The inaugural tournament was held from 30 September to 9 October 2004.

Myanmar became the first nation to win the tournament by beating Vietnam in the final.

Group stage

Group A

Group B

Knockout stage

Semi-finals

Third place match

Final

Awards

Goalscorers

Final ranking

External links 
 2004 AFF Women's Championship at RSSSF

Women's
AFF Women's
2004
International association football competitions hosted by Vietnam